Tirill Mohn (born 22 February 1975), also known mononymously as Tirill, is a Norwegian composer, singer and violinist. She was a member of the art rock band White Willow, and has released several solo albums.

Mohn is a descendant of the artists Christian Krohg and Oda Krohg. In 2019 she married the composer Marcus Paus; she and her husband are distantly related as both are descendants of Norway's first attorney-general Bredo Henrik von Munthe af Morgenstierne Sr.

Discography 
Solo albums
 A Dance with the Shadows (2003)
 Tales from Tranquil August Gardens (2011)  
 Nine and Fifty Swans (2011)
 Um Himinjǫður (2013)
 Said the Sun to the Moon (2019)
 Three Love Songs And A Swan Song (2022)

References 

1975 births
Living people
Norwegian composers
Norwegian women composers
Norwegian violinists
Norwegian songwriters